Cabillus is a genus of gobies native to the Indian and Pacific oceans.

Species
There are currently eight recognized species in this genus:
 Cabillus atripelvicus J. E. Randall, Ka. Sakamoto & Shibukawa, 2007
 Cabillus caudimacula D. W. Greenfield & J. E. Randall, 2004
 Cabillus lacertops J. L. B. Smith, 1959 (Lizard cabillus)
 Cabillus macrophthalmus (M. C. W. Weber, 1909) (Bigeye cabillus)
 Cabillus nigromarginatus Kovačić & Bogorodsky, 2013
 Cabillus nigrostigmus Kovačić & Bogorodsky, 2013
 Cabillus pexus Shibukawa & Aizawa, 2013
 Cabillus tongarevae (Fowler, 1927) (Tongareva goby)

References

Gobiidae